Brett Lamar Bech (born August 20, 1971) is a former American football wide receiver in the National Football League, Arena Football League and XFL. He is currently the Director of Strength Training Protocol for OxeFit, formerly the Dallas Cowboys assistant strength and conditioning coach. He played for the New Orleans Saints in the NFL, the Indiana Firebirds in the AFL and the Las Vegas Outlaws of the XFL. He played college football at LSU.

References

External links
Dallas Cowboys bio
Las Vegas Outlaws bio

1971 births
Living people
Players of American football from Louisiana
American football wide receivers
LSU Tigers football players
New Orleans Saints players
Las Vegas Outlaws (XFL) players
Indiana Firebirds players
New York Jets coaches
Jacksonville Jaguars coaches
Dallas Cowboys coaches
People from Slidell, Louisiana
Slidell High School alumni